The 2015 Ulster Senior Hurling Championship was the 67th staging of the Ulster hurling championship since its establishment by the Ulster Council in 1901. The championship began on 21 June 2015 and ended on 12 July 2015.

Antrim were the defending champions and successfully retained the title following a 1–15 to 1–14 defeat of Down in the final.

Ulster Senior Hurling Championship

Top scorers

Overall

Single game

References

Ulster
Hurling
Ulster Senior Hurling Championship
Ulster Senior Hurling Championship
Ulster Senior Hurling Championship